The Endeavour Railcars are a class of diesel multiple units operated by NSW TrainLink on passenger rail services in New South Wales, Australia on the Hunter, Blue Mountains (to Bathurst), Southern Highlands and South Coast lines (between Kiama and Bomaderry). They are mechanically identical to the Xplorers. All 30 carriages were built by ABB Transportation in Dandenong, Victoria.

Fourteen two-carriage sets were ordered in April 1992 to replace Class 620/720 railcars, DEB set railcars and locomotive hauled stock, with the first entering service in March 1994. In November 1994, one further two-carriage set was ordered. All are scheduled to be replaced in the early 2020s by the NSW TrainLink Regional Train Project.

Features 
Each set consists of two carriages, one having a wheelchair-accessible toilet (TE), and the other having luggage space and bicycles racks (LE). All cars are air-conditioned. They operate as four carriage sets on a few peak hour services.

The transmission incorporates a Voith KB260/r hydrodynamic brake. An auxiliary  Cummins LT10R(G) diesel engine drives a Newage Stamford UCI274F alternator to supply power for the air conditioning and lighting.

In service 
Endeavours operate on four lines:
 Hunter: between Newcastle Interchange and Maitland or Telarah, with some services extending to Dungog and Scone
 Main Western: the Bathurst Bullet service, between Sydney Central and Bathurst
 Southern Highlands: between Campbelltown and Moss Vale, with some services extending to Goulburn and Sydney Central
 Illawarra: between Bomaderry and Kiama

Endeavours previously operated weekend only Wollongong to Moss Vale services.

Refurbishment 

In 2009–2010, the Endeavours, along with the Xplorers, were refurbished by Bombardier Transportation in Dandenong. The refurbishment included:

 New reversible 3x2 seats, as found on the Hunter railcars and H sets, the seat covers are made of woollen moquette fabric which is more durable and vandal proof
 Vinyl flooring, replacing the original carpet flooring
 Voiceovers to closing the doors
 Improved air-conditioning system
 Improved crew facilities
 A new livery (blue and yellow front, black window band and underskirts, and yellow doors)

Second Refurbishment 

In 2017, the Endeavours were refurbished by Downer in Cardiff. The refurbishment includes:
 New lighting
 New flooring, similar to the Waratahs
 New livery
 Refurbished seating
 New drivers window wipers
 Refurbished Couplers (Auto and Intermediate)

Conversions to Xplorers 
The similarities of the Endeavours and Xplorers have allowed easy conversions. Endeavour carriages LE 2865 and TE 2815 were converted to Xplorer carriages EA 2508 and EC 2528. Endeavour carriage TE 2805 was temporarily converted to an Xplorer carriage between September and November 2007. The CityRail logos were removed and its skirts painted black, but it otherwise retained its livery. It also retained its carriage number.

See also 
The broad gauge VLocity DMU built for V/Line are an evolution of the Endeavour/Xplorer design.

References

External links 
 
 Technical drawings and specifications

ABB multiple units
Diesel multiple units of New South Wales
NSW TrainLink
Train-related introductions in 1994